"The Way I Like It" is a song by German recording artist Mandy Capristo. Written by David Jost and Swedish production team Twin, it was recorded by Capristo for her debut album Grace (2012).  Released as the album's lead single, it marked her first release as a solo artist following the disbandment of her band Monrose. Upon release, the electropop song reached number eleven on the German Singles Chart, while reaching the top thirty in Austria and Switzerland. It also served as theme song to the German comedy film , released in 2012.

Background 
Mandy Capristo published a short snippet of the single version on 1 March 2012. On 14 March the audience of Let's Dance could again hear a new section of the song. On 15 March an acoustic version of the song was presented that also appeared on the single. Capristo commented on the music selection "There have been so many songs that were attributed to me that we wrote together, or that I have written but when I heard 'The Way I Like It', I thought, 'This is it!' That's easy for me the most beautiful music."

Video shoot 
The video was first broadcast on the website MyVideo April 5. It was directed by Lennart Brede, who also shot the video for "This Is Me" for Monrose. Overall the shooting took over 20 hours, and three different settings  were chosen. At the beginning, Capristo walks through the gates of a huge castle in a pink Haute couture dress. Capristo said: "We wanted to get a contrast to a haute couture gown and went to an old ruin and shoot there. It was definitely very cold." Finally she goes dancing inside the walls of the building. This is interwoven with dream-like flashbacks shot in black and white where she lies in the arms of an unknown man. Finally, it starts to rain through the roof of the old building so that it is completely wet. "I had to shoot a rain scene at 3:30 in the morning. The water it was not heated." Some shots show a black outfit on a ledge of the castle. The video ends with a scene where the unknown man carries Capristo from a room. It fades to black.

Critical reception 
Bravo.de says it is a terrific single and a perfect start after turning off of Monrose.
The music magazine Yagaloo was surprised at the change of Capristos. You would have expected a ballad, are enthusiastic in spite of all of the new sound. They also reveal that the text is very easy to knit, yet remain in the ear.
Negative criticism came from the music but also Yagaloo magazine that criticizes the resemblance with Rihanna and Beyoncé.

Track listings
Digital download
"The Way I Like It " - 3:14
CD single
"The Way I Like It (Single Version)" - 3:14
"The Way I Like It (Acoustic Version)"  - 3:27
"One Moment in Time"  - 4:38

Charts

Weekly charts

Release history

References

2012 singles
2012 songs
Songs written by Niclas Molinder
Songs written by Joacim Persson
EMI Records singles
Songs written by David Jost
Song recordings produced by Twin (production team)